The Niagara Queen II is a small icebreaker that Ontario Power Generation uses to keep the inlet ports open at their plant on the Niagara River at Niagara Falls.

Niagara Queen II is a shallow draft river vessel designed by OPG and STX Marine. She replaced the Niagara Queen, a modified tugboat icebreaker operated by Ontario Hydro and now with OPG.

See also

 William H. Latham (icebreaker) - a similar (but larger) vessel used by the New York Power Authority.

References

Icebreakers of Canada
1992 ships